George Lea may refer to:

 Isaac Lea (footballer) (Isaac George Lea, 1911–1972), English footballer
 George Lea (British Army officer) (1912–1990)